Mavrata is a village in the municipal unit of Eleios-Pronnoi, in the southeastern part of the island of Cephalonia, Greece. In 2011 its population was 139. It is situated on a hill above the Ionian Sea coast, at about 180 m elevation. It is 1 km south of Chionata, 3 km southwest of Pastra and 10 km southwest of Poros. It was devastated by the 1953 Ionian earthquake.

Population

See also

List of settlements in Cephalonia

External links
Mavrata at the GTP Travel Pages

References

Eleios-Pronnoi
Populated places in Cephalonia